Daniel G. Hedaya (born July 24, 1940) is an American actor. He established himself as a supporting actor, often playing sleazy villains or wisecracking supporting characters. He has had supporting roles in films such as True Confessions (1981), The Adventures of Buckaroo Banzai Across the 8th Dimension, Tightrope, Blood Simple (all 1984), Commando (1985), Wise Guys (1986), Joe Versus the Volcano (1990), The Addams Family (1991), Rookie of the Year (1993), Boiling Point (1993), Clueless (1995), The First Wives Club, Daylight, Marvin's Room (all 1996), Alien Resurrection (1997), A Civil Action, A Night at the Roxbury (both 1998), The Hurricane, Dick (both 1999), Shaft, The Crew (both 2000), Swimfan (2002), Robots, and Strangers with Candy (both 2005).

Early life
Hedaya was born in New York City, to a Sephardic Jewish family from Aleppo, Syria. Hedaya was raised in Bensonhurst.  While a student at Tufts University, he began performing at the campus theater. He worked as a junior high school teacher for many years before deciding to pursue acting full-time. He studied acting at HB Studio in New York City.

Career
Alongside a successful career in the movies, Hedaya has appeared in several TV roles, including Carla Tortelli's ex-husband Nick on the sitcom Cheers and its short-lived spinoff The Tortellis. He played the estranged father of Mallory Keaton's boyfriend, Nick, on the sitcom Family Ties. More recently, he played an Italian-American priest in the controversial and quickly cancelled NBC series The Book of Daniel. Adding to his list of television credits is his performance as the long-lost father of Adrian Monk on Monk. He also guest starred in 1997 and 2005 as a wisecracking lawyer on the medical drama ER.

In films, Hedaya has played the evil dictator and the secondary antagonist Arius in 1985's Commando and Mel Horowitz, the father of Alicia Silverstone's Cher, in the 1995 film Clueless. He played Julian Marty, a cuckolded husband who plots his wife's murder in the first Coen Brothers film, Blood Simple. His resemblance to Richard Nixon led to his being cast as the former president for the film Dick. Hedaya appeared in several episodes of the television series Hill Street Blues as a corrupt, bigamist cop during the series' first season. During the 1980s Hedaya also appeared in the television series Miami Vice.

Although of Syrian Jewish descent, Hedaya is often cast in Italian-American roles.

Filmography

Film

Television

References

External links

1940 births
Living people
20th-century American male actors
20th-century Sephardi Jews
21st-century American male actors
21st-century Sephardi Jews
Male actors from New York City
American male film actors
American people of Syrian-Jewish descent
American Sephardic Jews
American Mizrahi Jews
American male television actors
Jewish American male actors
People from Bensonhurst, Brooklyn
Tufts University alumni
21st-century American Jews